Blue Creek is a stream in Berrien County, in the U.S. state of Michigan. It is a tributary to the Paw Paw River.

Blue Creek was so named on account of the blueish character of its water.

References

Rivers of Berrien County, Michigan
Rivers of Michigan